Yang Shuai (born 28 January 1997) is a Chinese footballer who currently plays for Chinese Super League side Henan Songshan Longmen as a left-footed centre-back.

Club career
Yang Shuai started his professional football career in 2017 when he was promoted to Chinese Super League side Liaoning FC's first team squad. On 2 May 2017, he made his senior debut in a 4–3 away defeat against Hangzhou Greentown, coming on as a substitute for Lu Qiang in the beginning of second half. He made his league debut on 10 August 2017, playing the whole match in a 3–0 home loss against Guangzhou Evergrande. On 24 April 2018, he scored his first senior goal in a 4–1 home loss against Dalian Yifang in the 2018 Chinese FA Cup.

On 12 February 2019, Yang transferred to Chinese Super League side Chongqing Lifan.

Career statistics
.

References

External links
 

1997 births
Living people
Chinese footballers
Footballers from Jiangsu
Sportspeople from Xuzhou
Liaoning F.C. players
Chongqing Liangjiang Athletic F.C. players
China League One players
Chinese Super League players
Association football defenders
21st-century Chinese people